L'Empereur Smith is a Lucky Luke adventure written by Goscinny and illustrated by Morris. It is the forty fifth book in the series and was originally published in French by Dargaud in the year 1976 and in English by Cinebook in 2010 as Emperor Smith. The story is loosely based on the life of the historical Emperor Norton of San Francisco.

Synopsis 
In the small town of Grass Town, Lucky Luke meets Dean Smith, a wealthy rancher in the area who has lost his mind and imagines himself to be the Emperor of the United States. Thanks to his fortune, Smith was able to afford to hire a small army, equipped with cannons, and to put on a whole apparatus. Amused by this character who they consider harmless, the people of Grass Town play the game and pretend to take Smith seriously.

The situation escalates when Buck Ritchie, a notorious bandit of the region, gets to meet Smith, and convince him to use his army to occupy the city. Terrorized, the locals rank on the side of Smith, who sets out to reconquer all the United States, making Grass Town the new capital of the country.

Judged for high treason, Sheriff Linen and Whitman, the editor of the newspaper, cowardly plead their case, and are pardoned by the Emperor Smith who gives them a title and a ministry to each. Convicted, Barney, the judge, is sentenced to death, commuted to life in prison, while Lucky Luke manages to escape, and plans to neutralize Smith, and free Grass Town. He does this by infiltrating a ball and kidnapping Smith. Gates, his second-in-command, and former cook, attempts to lead them, but with no-one to pay them, his soldiers quit. Luke arrests Gates. Richie duels Luke, cannon versus pistol, with Luke firing a bullet down the cannon, exploding it.

Luke goes to Smith, locked in a small hut nearby, and advises him to cross the nearby Rio Grande into Mexico.

Characters 

 Dean Smith: Rich rancher of the region who has gone mad, and imagines himself to be the Emperor of the United States; he now calls himself "Emperor Smith," and speaks of himself in the plural.
 Buck Ritchie: Notorious bandit, who manages to infiltrate Smith's army.
 Colonel Gates: former cook of Smith, who became his right-hand man. His important role also made him lose his head.
 Judge Barney: Judge of the city, he is the only notable of the city, helped by Lucky Luke, to oppose Smith when the situation degenerates.
 Sheriff Linen: Sheriff of the city, he does not concern himself with Smith, who he considers harmless and fun before he takes over. Cowardice leads him to join him.
 Rudolph Whitman: Director of the Grass Town Guardian, the city's newspaper, which publishes Smith's proclamations and decrees. He considers the latter as a picturesque figure before joining.

External links
Lucky Luke official site album index 
Goscinny website on Lucky Luke

Comics by Morris (cartoonist)
Lucky Luke albums
1976 graphic novels
Works by René Goscinny